André de Souza (born 11 July 1936) is a French boxer. He competed in the men's featherweight event at the 1956 Summer Olympics.

References

1936 births
Living people
French male boxers
Olympic boxers of France
Boxers at the 1956 Summer Olympics
Place of birth missing (living people)
Featherweight boxers